Carol Anne Franziska Antonia Pilars de Pilar (born 6 August 1961 in Bad Godesberg) is a German artist. She is the daughter of Josef Pilars de Pilar and his French wife Béatrice Lamotte d'Argy. Her great-grandparents are Ladislaus and Antonia Pilars de Pilar.

Life 
After Highschool in South Africa (1975–1976) Carol Pilar studied painting and restoration in Florence. Since 1985 she is working Künstlerin in Düsseldorf. Her paintings and sculptures are dealing with the tension between poverty and wealth.

Carol is living and working in Düsseldorf and is married with the photographerFranklin Berger. She has two children with the photographer Andreas Gursky.

Exhibitions 
 Lenzpumpen (1995), group exhibition in the Tabea Langenkamp Gallery
 Scharfer Blick (1995), group exhibition (with catalogue) in the Bundeskunsthalle, Bonn
 Ett hevetes förvandling (1996), Exhibition (with catalogue), Moderna Museet, Stockholm, Sweden
 Single exhibition in the Simon-Spiekermann-Galerie, Düsseldorf
 Toi Toi Toi (1998), group exhibition curated by Helga Meister, Düsseldorf, Germany
 Botschaft Düsseldorfer Project group exhibition (2001), Exhibition in the Simon-Spiekermann-Gallery with Volker Gatz, Düsseldorf
 Art Funds Stipend, Bonn (2002)
 Trendwände (2005), group exhibition in the Kunstraum Düsseldorf
 Große Kunstausstellung NRW (2005), Düsseldorf, Messehallen
 small Sculptures/large Aquarells (2006), single exhibition, Poststraße 3, Düsseldorf, Text Blazenka Perica
 Carol Pilars de Pilar/Franklin Berger (2007), Steinstraße 23, Düsseldorf
 Große Kunstausstellung NRW (2007), Museum Kunstpalast, Düsseldorf
 Bestiarium. The animal in the art (2008), group exhibition, Maxhaus, Düsseldorf
 Kunsthalle Flingern (2008), group exhibition, Düsseldorf

References

External links 
 Webseite Carol Pilars de Pilar

1961 births
Living people
German artists
Barons Pilars de Pilar
Russian noble families